Richard Hudson (October 7, 1898 – ), sometimes known by the nickname "Super Six", was an American football player.  He played professional football in the National Football League (NFL) as a back for the Minneapolis Marines in 1923 and for the Hammond Pros in 1925 and 1926. He appeared in eight NFL games, seven as a starter. He was among the early African Americans to play in the NFL and one of only 13 African-Americans to play in the league prior to World War II.

References

1898 births
Minneapolis Marines players
Hammond Pros players
Year of death missing